Nicolas John Barker  (born 1932) is a British historian of printing and books. He was Head of Conservation at the British Library from 1976 to 1992 and is a former editor of The Book Collector. 

A bibliography of his work was published to mark his 80th birthday in 2012. He was elected a Fellow of the British Academy in 1998, and is also a Fellow of the Society of Antiquaries of London; in 2002, he was appointed an Officer of the Order of the British Empire.

Selected works
Barker, Nicolas (1972). Stanley Morison. London: Macmillan.
Barker, Nicolas (1978). Bibliotheca Lindesiana: the Lives and Collections of Alexander William, 25th Earl of Crawford and 8th Earl of Balcarres, and James Ludovic, 26th Earl of Crawford and 9th Earl of Balcarres. London: for Presentation to the Roxburghe Club, and published by Bernard Quaritch
Barker, Nicolas (1987). The Butterfly Books. An Enquiry into the Nature of Certain Twentieth Century Pamphlets. London: Bertram Rota.
Barker, Nicolas (1988). Two East Anglian Picture Books.
Barker, Nicolas (1989) Treasures of the British Library; compiled by Nicolas Barker and the curatorial staff of the British Library. New York: Harry N. Abrams 
Barker, Nicolas (2000). The Great Book of Thomas Trevilian.
Barker, Nicolas (2003). Form and Meaning in the History of the Book. Selected Essays by Nicolas Barker. London: British Library.
  
Barker, Nicolas (2020).  Reginald Heber: A Letter from India.

References

External links
LinkedIn

Living people
Employees of the British Library
1932 births
Fellows of the British Academy
Fellows of the Society of Antiquaries of London
Historians of printing
Officers of the Order of the British Empire